This is a list of members of the Western Australian Legislative Assembly between the 1933 election and the 1936 election, together known as the 15th Parliament.

Notes
 Following the 1933 state election a new Ministry consisting of eight members, including one Member of the Legislative Council, was appointed on 24 April 1933. These members were therefore required to resign and contest ministerial by-elections on 2 May 1933, at which all were returned unopposed.
 At the 1933 election, Labor member Aubrey Coverley won the seat of Kimberley by just 32 votes against the Nationalist candidate Arthur Povah. On 3 July 1933, the Court of Disputed Returns ordered a fresh election for 29 July, which Coverley won by 289 votes.
 On 16 March 1935, the Labor member for South Fremantle, Alick McCallum, resigned. Labor candidate Thomas Fox won the resulting by-election held on 4 May 1935.
 Frank Wise was appointed Minister for Agriculture on 26 March 1935 following the departure of Alick McCallum from the Ministry, and was therefore required to resign and contest a ministerial by-election on 11 April 1935, at which he was returned unopposed.
 On 23 March 1935, the Country member for Avon, Harry Griffiths, died. Country candidate Ignatius Boyle won the resulting by-election held on 4 May 1935.
 On 21 July 1935, the Country member for Katanning, Arnold Piesse, died. Country candidate Arthur Watts won the resulting by-election held on 31 August 1935.

Sources
 
 

Members of Western Australian parliaments by term